Paltus may also refer to a Russian Kilo class submarine

Paltus or Paltos is a ruined city. It was also a bishopric, a suffragan of Seleucia Pieria in the Roman province of Syria Prima, that, no longer being a residential see, is included in the Catholic Church's list of titular sees.

The ruins of Paltus may be seen at Belde (Arab al-Mulk) at the south of Nahr al-Sin or Nahr al-Melek, the ancient Badan.

The town was founded by a colony from Arvad or Aradus (Arrianus, Anab. II, xiii, 17). It is located in Syria by Pliny the Elder (Hist. Natur., V, xviii) and Ptolemy (V, xiv, 2); Strabo (XV, iii, 2; XVI, ii, 12) places it near the river Badan. When the province of Theodorias was established by the Byzantine emperor Justinian I, Paltus became a part of it (Georgii Cyprii Descriptio orbis romani, ed. Heinrich Gelzer, 45).

From the sixth century according to the Notitia episcopatuum of Anastasius [Échos d'Orient, X, (1907), 144] it was an autocephalous archdiocese and depended on the patriarch of Antioch. In the tenth century it still existed and its precise limits are known [Échos d'Orient, X (1907), 97].

Le Quien (Oriens christianus, II, 799) mentions five of its bishops: 
Cymatius, friend of St. Athanasius, and Patricius, his successor
Severus (381)
Sabbas at the Council of Chalcedon in 451 AD
John, exiled by the Monophysites and reinstated by Emperor Justin I in 518.

References

Hellenistic sites in Syria
Phoenician cities
Roman sites in Syria
Catholic titular sees in Asia
Former populated places in Syria